The  was the subnational government structure in early Meiji Japan. It lasted from the Boshin War, the start to the Meiji Restoration, in 1868 until the replacement of all remaining feudal domains (-han) with prefectures (-ken) in 1871. The exact numbers varied continually as adjustments to the feudal territorial divisions, mergers and splits started to take up pace, but very roughly there were about >250 -han and about <50 -fu/-ken in total during this time.

As the political borders changed all the time, ancient ritsuryō provinces, essentially static except for some modernizing adjustments in the North where the giant provinces of Mutsu and Dewa (both Tōsan Circuit) were split up and a new circuit (Hokkai Circuit) with 10 provinces was added on Ezo, remained the primary geographic frame of reference even in Meiji Japan until around the turn of the century – just as they had been throughout the late Middle Ages and early modern period.

Background 
Ignoring minor territories such as Imperial Court lands or spiritual (shrine/temple) holdings, pre-restoration Japan was subdivided two types of territories: 1. the bakufu/shogunate territories (baku-ryō, subsequently also called ten-ryō, "Imperial territories") held by the Tokugawa directly through local administrators (daikan, bugyō, etc.) or the shogunate's minor vassals (sometimes grouped separately as hatamoto-ryō) and 2. other families' feudal domain holdings (han-ryō). In the Boshin War and the beginning Meiji Restoration, the conquered/surrendered shogunate lands and a few rebel/shogunate loyalist domains such as Aizu/Wakamatsu or Morioka/Morioka were organized in prefectures (urban -fu and rural -ken) while all other feudal domains (-han) were allowed to continue to exist until 1871. Some domains were only newly created in the restoration, such as Shizuoka Domain which was granted to the Tokugawa after their fall and submission to the new government, or Tonami Domain which was created from parts of Morioka and left to a child heir of Aizu after the main territory of Aizu had been vanquished. The subnational administration in this period from 1868 to 1871 when centrally governed prefectures coexisted as primary subdivision of the country with domains, pledged into submission to the new Satsuma-Chōshū-dominated Imperial government, but still governed by their Tokugawa period feudal rulers, constitutes the -fu/-han/-ken system.

Territorial composition and naming 
Some of the current prefectures of Japan were created in this period, but they looked very different from what they are today, still with many disjoint feudal period ex- and enclaves as the domains remained mostly untouched and only the ex-shogunate/Imperial lands became prefectures. Some examples:
 Nagasaki Prefecture in 1868, successor to the Nagasaki bugyō, covered less than what is today Nagasaki City and surrounding shogunate lands, was later expanded to include even what is today Saga Prefecture to recede to its current borders in 1883.
 Osaka Prefecture, successor to the Osaka machi-bugyō, covered less than what is today Osaka City plus former shogunate territories mostly in Settsu Province, it was later expanded to include even what is today Nara Prefecture, it reached its current borders in 1887 (see the List of mergers in Osaka Prefecture)
 The first Nara Prefecture of 1868 covered shogunate territories in Yamato Province; in the 1871/72 first wave of prefectural mergers which followed the replacement of all feudal domains (-han) with prefectures (-ken) (called "abolition of -han & establishment of -ken" [haihan-chiken] in Japan, Abolition of the han system in the English Wikipedia), it was merged with the other prefectures in Yamato to cover all of Yamato. Nara ceased to exist in the second wave of prefectural mergers in 1876 when it was merged into Sakai Prefecture (堺県). (see Nara Prefecture#The establishment of Nara Prefecture)
 Shogunate territories in Ōmi Province which had been governed by the Ōtsu bugyō became Ōtsu Prefecture (大津県) in 1868. In the replacement of domains with prefectures in 1871 and the subsequent prefectural mergers, Ōtsu was enlarged and several of the new, other prefectures/ex-domains in Ōmi Province (Hikone, Ōmi-Miyagawa, Yamakami, Asahiyama) were merged to become Inukami Prefecture (犬上県), then, in 1872, Ōtsu and Inukami were merged to become Shiga Prefecture, it reached its present borders in 1881. (see Shiga Prefecture#History)
 The port town of Niigata had come under direct shogunate control in the 1840s, it was a (planned) treaty port forced open under the unequal treaties with the European colonial powers (Harris Treaty 1858); in 1868, the Shogunate controlled town (much less than what is today Niigata City which reached its current extent in 2005) and the scattered surrounding shogunate holdings in Echigo Province became Echigo Prefecture (越後府), later renamed to Niigata. The shogunate administration of fully Shogunate-controlled Sado Province became Sado Prefecture (佐渡県) in the restoration, later renamed to Aikawa. The fiefdoms in Echigo held by other families stayed fiefdoms in Echigo until fiefdoms were replaced with prefectures in 1871. Another prefecture to be created in Echigo Province was Kashiwazaki Prefecture (柏崎県). After a series of repeated mergers, name changes and splits (see the individual articles for details), the prefectures in Echigo and Sado were ultimately merged to become one single prefecture, present-day Niigata Prefecture. It reached essentially its current borders in 1886 when East Kanbara County was transferred from Fukushima to Niigata.

Other prefectures only existed under the fu/han/ken system. For example, Nirayama-ken replaced the Nirayma daikan, the shogunate administrator of shogunate possessions in Izu, Suruga, Sagami and Musashi provinces, seated in Nirayama in Izu Province. Its main part was merged into Ashigara Prefecture in 1871/72 while exclaves went to other prefectures. Since the 1880s, Nirayama's former territory is split between Shizuoka, Yamanashi, Tokyo, Kanagawa and Saitama.

It was the convention to name prefectures and han after the location of their [actual or in some cases: planned] prefectural/domain government, either by town/village or later often by ritsuryō district (e.g. Mie, Saitama, Inba, Gunma). ken created in 1871 are generally named after their precursor han.

History 

All other areas still under the power of a daimyo, han, were left as they were with no structure changes, and an independent justice system.

On June 14, 1868, Hakodate-fu and Kyoto-fu were established as the first two prefectures under the new changes. At the time, the Imperial government army forces were fighting the Republic of Ezo in the Battle of Hakodate, and despite the proclamation, the city of Hakodate had not fallen yet. By end of June, 11 prefectures had been created, including Edo-fu.

In July and August 1869 during the abolition of the han system, the government issued  to the remaining Han, asking them to voluntarily return their domains, and later were ordered to by the Court, on threat of military action.

Many territories that became the first prefectures were territories confiscated from domains in the Boshin War, especially domains part of the Ōuetsu Reppan Dōmei alliance.

Areas in Kanto did not initially receive a proper prefecture name and suffix, even though they had appointed officials for the areas.

Establishment of urban prefectures 

When initially creating prefecture suffixes, the Seitaisho proclaimed all areas with a jōdai (castle minder), namely Osaka, Sunpu and Kyoto, the shoshidai or a bugyō were given the prefectural suffix fu, while any other area was designated ken. The first two  were created on June 14, 1868: Kyoto-fu and Hakodate-fu. By the end of 1868, ten fu had been established: Kyoto, Hakodate, Osaka, Nagasaki, Edo (later Tokyo), Kanagawa, Watarai, Nara, Echigo (later Niigata) and Kōfu. Due to some prefectures gaining non-urban land or being amalgamated into other territories, in 1869 three remained: Kyoto-fu, Osaka-fu and Tokyo-fu. This remained the same until 1943, when Tokyo-fu and Tokyo-shi were merged to form Tokyo-to.

Aftermath 
After three major merger/reorganization waves and many smaller mergers, splits and border changes between the initially >300 prefectures (down to 75 by 1872, to <40 in the late 1870s), they took generally their present forms in the 1890s. The last change involving an entire prefecture was the separation of Kagawa from Ehime in 1888, a very late large territorial change was the transfer of the Tama area from Kanagawa to Tokyo in 1893. (Comparatively smaller changes through cross-prefectural municipal mergers or transfers of single neighbourhoods, border corrections through land changes, etc. continue to the day.) After the 1871/72 mergers, prefectures are contiguous, compact territories resembling or even identical to the ritsuryō provinces in many places.

Established prefectures 

The prefectures (-fu/-ken) listed below were all established before the replacement of all domains (-han) with prefectures (-ken), i.e. under the fu/han/ken system. Disestablishment is only listed if prior to August 29, 1871, the time when all remaining domains were turned into prefectures. For the >300 prefectures immediately after that, look somewhere else. For the 75 prefectures after the 1871/72 wave of prefectural mergers, see the List of Japanese prefectures.

For a complete list of not only -fu/-ken, but all -fu/-han/-ken at two points in time, see the List of Japanese prefectures by population#1868 to 1871, it also indicates the (often disjoint) territorial extent of the prefectures and domains in this period by listing the provinces the prefectures/domains extended to and the number of exclaves.

Hokkaido and Tōhoku 

After the Daimyo of the northern domains were stripped of their social status in the Boshin War, the following Prefectures were created. These were mostly in name only, and did not function as proper entities.

Kantō region

Chūbu region

Kansai region

Chūgoku region, Shikoku

Kyushu

External links 
 Ishida Satoshi: Lists of prefectures and domains under the fu/han/ken system between the restoration and the replacement of domains with prefectures by region; lists & maps of Japan's prefectures after the fu/han/ken system had ended and the first wave of mergers 1871/72 had taken place, after the second wave of prefectural mergers in 1876 and in January 1889 briefly before prefectures were subdivided into cities, towns and villages

References 

1868 in Japan
Boshin War
Former provinces of Japan
Meiji Restoration
Politics of the Empire of Japan